The New Wave (abbreviated as ) was a self-proclaimed centrist political party in South Korea created to assist in Kim Dong-yeon's run in the 2022 South Korean presidential election.

History

The New Wave Party was formed in October 2021 to assist career civil servant and former Deputy Prime Minister Kim Dong-yeon's run in the 2022 presidential election. "As long as the current political ecosystem dominated by the two major parties remains, it is impossible to resolve structural problems that Korea has been suffering from for the past 20 years," Kim said during the party's founding ceremony. Kim denied merging his new party with the two ruling parties in Korea, the Democrats and People Power.

Cho Jung-hoon, proportional representative Member of Parliament for Transition Korea, expressed his support for the creation of the Party.

On October 24, 2021, the Party adopted four key "visions:"

Create a ‘Youth Investment Nation’ by creating a youth startup paradise
Work-based government through regulatory reform.
Resolve ‘opportunities polarization’ in income, real estate, and education
‘Political reforms’ to break the winner-take-all political structure, including a 3-year limited decentralized Presidency.

On April 7, 2022, party leader Kim Dong-yeon agreed to merge the New Wave with the Democratic Party of Korea to promote change in politics and national unity. The merger was completed by April 15, 2022.

Election results

References

Political parties in South Korea
Political parties established in 2021
Political parties disestablished in 2022
2021 establishments in South Korea
2022 disestablishments in South Korea
Defunct political parties in South Korea
Centrist parties in Asia
Democratic parties in South Korea